Griffith Vaissaire is a Surinamese footballer who plays as a centre back for Dutch club SSS Klaaswaal and the Suriname women's national team.

International career
Vaissaire capped for Suriname at senior level during the 2022 CONCACAF W Championship qualification.

References

External links

Living people
People with acquired Surinamese citizenship
Surinamese women's footballers
Women's association football central defenders
Suriname women's international footballers
Dutch women's footballers
Dutch sportspeople of Surinamese descent
Year of birth missing (living people)